The Loyal Nine (also spelled Loyall Nine) were nine American patriots from Boston who met in secret to plan protests against the Stamp Act of 1765. Mostly middle-class businessmen, the Loyal Nine enlisted Ebenezer Mackintosh to rally large crowds of commoners to their cause and provided the protesters with food, drink, and supplies. A precursor to the Sons of Liberty, the group is credited with establishing the Liberty Tree as a central gathering place for Boston patriots.

History

Stamp Act protests 

Sometime after the Stamp Act was passed in March 1765, the Loyal Nine began meeting at the office of the Boston Gazette with the goal of preventing the act from taking effect that November. In August, they found a mob captain among the common people to do their bidding: a shoemaker by the name of Ebenezer Mackintosh.

Mackintosh already had experience leading unruly mobs. Once a year on November 5, Boston's lower classes celebrated Pope Night, an anti-Catholic holiday in which rival gangs from the North and South Ends battled for the honor of burning an effigy of the pope. As the leader of the South End gang, Mackintosh could easily gather two or three thousand men on short notice. The Loyal Nine arranged for the gangs to unite in protest against the Stamp Act, with Mackintosh as their leader. The officers of the group were wined, dined, and outfitted by John Hancock and other local merchants.

Under the direction of the Loyal Nine, Mackintosh led two mob actions that August, two more in November, and another in December. The first of these protests took place under a large elm tree in Hanover Square near the Chase and Speakman distillery. The tree became known as the Liberty Tree, and was a central gathering place for speeches, processions, and the hanging of effigies. The businessmen took care to keep their own identities secret and let Mackintosh take responsibility for the actions of the mob. Henry Bass, one of the Loyal Nine, admitted as much in a December 1765 letter:

We do everything in order to keep this and the first Affair Private: and are not a little pleas'd to hear that McIntosh has the Credit of the whole Affair.

Members of the Loyal Nine may have participated in the Stamp Act protests along with Mackintosh and his mob. Witnesses reported seeing "gentlemen" dressed as workmen in the crowd, and one witness saw a rioter's trouser leg slide up, revealing silk stockings.

The businessmen later distanced themselves from Mackintosh. Some felt he had allowed the protests to become too violent, particularly the August 26 raid that destroyed the home of Lieutenant Governor Thomas Hutchinson. Fearing Mackintosh was another "Masaniello" (an Italian fisherman who had led a proletarian rebellion in the 17th century), they replaced him with Thomas Young and William Molineaux, members of their own social circle.

Later activities 

The Loyal Nine all became active members of the Sons of Liberty. By some accounts, they were the leaders of the organization in its earliest days.

Loyal Nine members Henry Bass, Thomas Chase, and Benjamin Edes became members of the North End Caucus, a political group reputedly involved in the planning of the Boston Tea Party. John Avery, Thomas Chase, Steven Cleverly, and Thomas Crafts attended the planning meeting. It was held in a small counting room above Chase and Speakman's distillery. At the actual event, Bass, Chase, Crafts, and Edes actively participated in the destruction of British East India Company tea.

Members 

According to the Boston Tea Party Museum, the nine members were:

John Avery, distiller; club secretary
 Henry Bass, jeweller; a cousin of Samuel Adams
 Thomas Chase, distiller
 Steven Cleverly, brazier 
 Thomas Crafts, painter and Japanner 
 Benjamin Edes, printer of the Boston Gazette; a friend of Samuel Adams
 Joseph Field, ship captain
 John Smith, brazier
 George Trott, jeweller

Samuel Adams, who is often credited with founding the Sons of Liberty, was not a member of the Loyal Nine, but often met with them. Several other men are thought to have been involved with the group at one time or another:

 John Adams, lawyer
 Chase Avery, distiller
 Benjamin Church, medical doctor
 William Cooper, town clerk
 Solomon Davis, merchant
 John Gill, co-owner of the Boston Gazette
 John Hancock, merchant
 Gabriel Johonnot, distiller;
 John Mackay, merchant
 William Molineaux, merchant
 James Otis, lawyer
 William Phillips, lawyer
 Paul Revere, silversmith and engraver
 John Rowe, merchant
 John Scollay, selectman and town council chairman
 Joseph Warren, medical doctor 
 Henry Welles, ship captain
 Thomas Young, medical doctor

See also 
 Bathsheba Spooner

References

Citations

Bibliography

Further reading 

 
 
 
 
 
 
 

 
1765 establishments in Massachusetts
History of Boston
Patriotic societies
Patriots in the American Revolution
People from colonial Boston
Secret societies in the United States